The 2020–21 season was the 106th season of the Isthmian League, which is an English football competition featuring semi-professional and amateur clubs from London, East and South East England. The league operates four divisions, the Premier Division at Step 3, and three divisions, North, South Central and South East at Step 4 of the National League System. This was the third season since the former South Division was subdivided into the South Central and South East divisions. The league is also known as the Pitching In League under a sponsorship deal with Entain, formerly GVC Holdings.

The allocations for Steps 3 and 4 for season 2020–21 were announced by the FA on 21 July 2020.

Due to the restrictions on clubs' ability to play matches in the lockdowns associated with the COVID-19 pandemic, competitions at Steps 3–6 were curtailed on 24 February 2021. The scheduled restructuring of non-league took place at the end of the season, with a new division added to Northern Premier League at Step 4 for 2021–22, which resulted in some reallocations into or out of, and promotions to, the Isthmian League's Step 4 divisions.

Premier Division
The Premier Division comprised the same set of 22 teams which competed in the aborted competition the previous season.

League table

Results table

Stadia and locations

North Division
The North Division comprised the same set of 20 teams which competed in the aborted competition the previous season.

League table

Results table

Stadia and locations

South Central Division
The South Central Division comprised the same set of 20 teams which competed in the aborted competition the previous season.

League table

Results table

Stadia and locations

South East Division
The South East Division comprised 19 of the 20 teams which competed in the aborted competition the previous season. Guernsey withdrew from this season due to travel restrictions.

League table

Results table

Stadia and locations

League Cup

The 2020–21 Velocity Trophy (formerly the Isthmian League Cup) was to be the 47th season of the Alan Turvey Trophy, the cup competition of the whole Isthmian League. It would have been the second season since the group stage was introduced. The cup was not held.

See also
Isthmian League
2020–21 Northern Premier League
2020–21 Southern Football League

References

External links
Official website

2020–21
7
Eng
Eng